Walter Scharf (August 1, 1910 – February 24, 2003) was an American musician, best known as a film, television and concert composer and arranger/conductor.

Biography

Broadway theatre
Born in Manhattan, he was the son of Yiddish theatre comic Bessie Zwerling. While in his 20s, he was one of the orchestrators for George Gershwin's Broadway musical Girl Crazy, became singer Helen Morgan's accompanist, and later worked as pianist and arranger for singer Rudy Vallee.

Film
He began working in Hollywood in 1933, arranging for Al Jolson at Warner Bros., Alice Faye at 20th Century-Fox and Bing Crosby at Paramount. He orchestrated the original version of Irving Berlin's White Christmas for the film Holiday Inn (1942), and from 1942 to 1946 he served as head of music for Republic Pictures.

From 1948 to 1954, Scharf was arranger-conductor for the Phil Harris-Alice Faye radio show.

A ten-time Oscar nominee, Scharf worked on more than 100 films, receiving nominations for his musical direction on such pictures as Danny Kaye's Hans Christian Andersen (1952), Barbra Streisand's Funny Girl (1968) and Willy Wonka & the Chocolate Factory (1971).

In the early 1960s, he was approached by Harold Lloyd to provide new scores for his silent film compilations. Lloyd regarded Scharf's ability to mix comedy themes with big, dramatic orchestral touches as ideal for his brand of 'thrill' comedy.

Scharf implemented a similar style for the Jerry Lewis Jekyll and Hyde-inspired comedy The Nutty Professor in (1963), working on more than a dozen Lewis comedies overall. He worked on three Elvis Presley pictures including Loving You (1957) and King Creole (1958), and with lyricist Don Black, he wrote the hit Michael Jackson single from the film  Ben (1972), which won him a Golden Globe; and scored the popular Walking Tall (1973) and its two sequels. In 1973, he and Don Black wrote the music and lyrics for the London musical Maybe That's Your Problem (book by Lionel Chetwynd).

Television
Scharf composed music for dozens of television dramas including Ben Casey, The Man from U.N.C.L.E., Mission: Impossible, and the 1979 miniseries From Here to Eternity and Blind Ambition, although he became best known for his music for the National Geographic Society and The Undersea World of Jacques Cousteau documentaries, which he scored between 1965 and 1975.

Concert writing
Scharf's initial work for the concert hall was The Palestine Suite, written in 1945 and performed at the Hollywood Bowl under Leopold Stokowski. After retiring from films and TV in the 1980s, he returned to concert writing, notably with The Tree Still Stands: A Symphonic Portrait of the Stages of a Hebraic Man, commissioned by the Stephen S. Wise Temple and first performed in 1989, and the 1993 Israeli Suite.  He also wrote an unproduced opera based on Norman Corwin's The Plot to Overthrow Christmas.

Scharf died of heart failure at his home in the Brentwood neighborhood of Los Angeles, at the age of 92.

Awards and honors
Scharf received the Golden Score Award from the American Society of Music Arrangers and Composers in 1997.

Selected filmography

 Josette (1938)
 Hit Parade of 1941 (1940)
 Thumbs Up (1943)
 Someone to Remember (1943)
 In Old Oklahoma (1943)
 The Fighting Seabees (1944)
 The Lady and the Monster
 Atlantic City (1944)
 Lake Placid Serenade (1944)
 Earl Carroll Vanities (1945)
 The Cheaters (1945)
 Mexicana (1945)
 Dakota (1945)
 I've Always Loved You (1946)
 Casbah (1948)
 The Saxon Charm (1948)
 City Across the River (1949)
 Red Canyon (1949)
 Take One False Step (1949)
 Yes Sir, That's My Baby (1949)
 Buccaneer's Girl (1950)
 Sierra (1950)
 South Sea Sinner (1950)
 Deported (1950)
 The Court Jester (1955)
 Time Table (1956)
Three Violent People (1957)
The Joker Is Wild (1957)
The Geisha Boy (1958)
Don't Give Up the Ship (1959)
The Bellboy (1960)
Cinderfella (1960)
The Ladies Man (1961)
The Errand Boy (1961)
It's Only Money (1962)
My Six Loves (1963)
The Nutty Professor (1963)
Honeymoon Hotel (1964)
 Where Love Has Gone (1964)
Funny Girl (1968)
Pendulum (1969)
If It's Tuesday, This Must Be Belgium (1969)
The Cheyenne Social Club (1970)
Willy Wonka & the Chocolate Factory (1971)
Ben (1972)
Walking Tall (1973)
Walking Tall Part 2 (1975)
Walking Tall: Final Chapter (1977)
When Every Day Was the Fourth of July (1978)
The Triangle Factory Fire Scandal (1979)
The Scarlett O'Hara War (1980)
Twilight Time (1982)

References

External links

1910 births
2003 deaths
20th-century American composers
20th-century American Jews
20th-century American male musicians
21st-century American Jews
American film score composers
American male film score composers
American television composers
Animated film score composers
Burials at Mount Sinai Memorial Park Cemetery
Golden Globe Award-winning musicians
Jewish American classical musicians
Jewish American film score composers
Jewish American television composers
Jubilee Records artists
Male television composers
Musicians from New York City